An examination book, or exam book, or Blue book is a notebook used by students of many post-secondary schools in the United States to write essays and answer multiple short-answer questions when their assessment tests are administered. The books commonly have blue cover and are titled "Blue book", although books called simply "Examination book" can be found as well.

See also
Blue book exam
Exercise book
Notebook
Ruled paper

References

School examinations
Notebooks